Alva Lorenzo Smith (5 January 1850, Grant County, Wisconsin – 13 May 1924, Omaha, Nebraska) was a member of the Nebraska State Senate from 1885 to 1886 as a member of the Republican Party.

References

External links
 

1850 births
1924 deaths
People from Wisconsin
Republican Party Nebraska state senators